Hamanose Dam  is a gravity dam located in Miyazaki Prefecture in Japan. The dam is used for irrigation. The catchment area of the dam is 54.5 km2. The dam impounds about 58  ha of land when full and can store 10300 thousand cubic meters of water. The construction of the dam was started on 1994 and completed in 2014.

See also
List of dams in Japan

References

Dams in Miyazaki Prefecture